Yun Won-hyeong (1503 – 18 November 1565) was a Korean political figure of the Joseon period. He was the younger brother of Queen Munjeong, the 3rd wife of 11th King Jungjong and was the maternal uncle of the 13th King Myeongjong.

He was Chief State Councillor from 1563 to 1565. His courtesy name was Eonpyung (언평; 彦平). In 1565, after the death of Queen Munjeong, both Yun Won-hyeong and his wife  Jeong Nan-jeong were exiled from the capital. Unable to make a political comeback, both committed suicide by poison.

Life 
In 1503, Yun Won-hyeong was born as the fifth son of Yun Ji-im, father of Queen Munjung and third cousin of Queen Janggyeong and Yun Im. He was also the great-great-grandnephew of Queen Jeonghui, who was the wife of Joseon Dynasty's 7th King Sejo of Joseon.

Yun Won-hyeong was a political figure from an aristocratic family and a maternal relation of the royal family of the Joseon Dynasty. His family was of the Papyeong Yun clan (Hangul: 파평윤씨, Hanja: 波平尹氏). His elder sister, Lady Yun, was a concubine to King Jungjong of Joseon, and his niece Lady Yun was a concubine to King Injong. In March 1515, Jungjong's second wife Queen Janggyeong died and Jungjong formally married Yun Won-hyeong's older sister Lady Yun to be the new Queen Consort. Their son was Grand Prince Gyeongwon (the future King Myeongjong).

In 1533, Yun Won-hyeong passed the national examinations, and was appointed to the literature department of Byeol to become an officer. While pursuing an officer position, Yun also sought to make his nephew, Grand Prince Gyeongwon, the next king of Joseon. Yun was temporarily exiled for his actions but came back in 1544. He ran into some conflicts with two relatives who were officials: Yun Im and Kim Ahn-ro. This made for a difficult situation, since Kim Ahn-ro's granddaughter (the daughter of Princess Hyohye and his son, Kim Hui) had married Yun Won-hyeong's own nephew, Yun Baek-won. Also, Yun Im was the maternal uncle of Injong and the older brother of Queen Janggyeong.

In 1543, King Jungjong died. In 1545, King Injong died. Yun Won-hyeong killed his opponents and relatives that supported his third cousin, among these being Yun Im. Later, his brother Yun Won-ro was killed (the Eulsa massacre). In 1546, he controlled political powers.
In 1547 he became Minister of Personnel (Ijo Panseo), in 1551 Left State Councillor, and in 1563 Chief State Councillor.

When Queen Munjeong died in 1565, he lost all political power. This caused he and his second wife, Jeong Nan-Jeong to commit suicide.

Family 
 Great-Great-Great-Grandfather
 Yun Beon (1384 – 1448) (윤번), Prime Minister during the reign of King Sejo of Joseon
 Great-Great-Great-Grandmother 
 Grand Internal Princess Consort Heungnyeong of the Incheon Lee clan (흥녕부대부인 인천 이씨, 興寧府大夫人 仁川 李氏) (1383 - 1456)
 Great-Great-Grandfather
 Yun Sa-Heun (1422 – 1485) (윤사흔, 尹士昐); Queen Jeonghui's younger brother 
 Great-Great-Grandmother
 Lady Kim of the Gyerim Kim clan (계림 김씨, 鷄林 金氏)
Great-Grandfather
 Yun Gye-Gyeom (1442 – 1483) (윤계겸)
 Grandfather 
 Yun Uk (윤욱, 尹頊) (1459 - 1485)
 Grandmother 
 Lady Jeong of the Yeonil Jeong clan (영일 정씨) (? - 1520)
 Father
 Yun Ji-im (윤지임, 尹之任) (1475 - 14 April 1534)
 Mother
 Lady Jeonseong of the Jeonui Lee clan (전성부부인 전의 이씨, 全城府夫人 全義李氏) (1475 - 1511)
 Brothers
 Older brother: Yun Won-gae (윤원개, 尹元凱)
 Sister-in-law: Lady Lee (이씨)
 Nephew: Yun Gi (윤기, 尹紀)
 Nephew: Yun Kang (윤강, 尹綱)
 Niece: Lady Yun (윤씨)
 Nephew-in-law: Gu Yun (구윤, 具潤) of the Neungseung Gu clan
 Older brother: Yun Won-Ryang (1495 – 1569) (윤원량, 尹元亮)
 Sister-in-law: Lady Jang of the Suncheon Jang clan (순천 장씨)
 Nephew Yun So (윤소, 尹紹) (1515 - 1544)
 Grandniece: Lady Yun (윤씨, 尹氏) (? - October 1566)
 Nephew: Yun Chan (윤찬, 尹纘)
 Nephew: Yun Chi (윤치, 尹緻)
 Niece: Royal Noble Consort Suk of the Papyeong Yun clan (숙빈 윤씨, 淑嬪 尹氏) (? - 1595)
 Older brother: Yun Won-Pil (1496 – 9 May 1547) (윤원필, 尹元弼)
 Sister-in-law: Lady Jeong of the Gyeongju Jeong clan (경주 정씨)
 Nephew: Yun Yun (윤윤, 尹綸)
 Nephew: Yun Wi (윤위, 尹緯)
 Nephew: Yun Hoe (윤회, 尹繪)
 Nephew: Yun Jib (윤집, 尹緝)
 Older brother: Yun Won-Ro (? – 1547) (윤원로, 尹元老)
 Sister-in-law: Lady Yi of the Jeonju Yi clan (전주 이씨)
 Sister-in-law: Lady Yi of the Pyeongchang Yi clan (평창 이씨)
 Nephew: Yun Baek-won (윤백원, 尹百源) (1528 - 1589)
 Niece-in-law: Lady Kim Seon-ok (김선옥, 金善玉) of the Yeonan Kim clan (1531 - ?)
 Grandniece: Lady Yun Gaemichi (개미치)
 Niece-in-law: Lady Bok-yi (복이)
 Grandnephew: Yun Deok-gyeong (윤덕경)
 Nephew: Yun Cheon-won (윤천원, 尹千源)
 Nephew: Yun Man-won (윤만원, 尹萬源)
 Sister-in-law: Lady Min of the Yeoheung Min clan (여흥 민씨)
 Nephew: Yun Jo-won (윤조원)
 Sisters
 Older sister: Lady Yun (윤씨)
 Older sister: Queen Munjeong of the Papyeong Yun clan (문정왕후 윤씨, 文定王后 尹氏) (2 December 1501 - 5 May 1565)
 Brother-in-law: King Jungjong of Joseon (조선 중종) (16 April 1488 – 29 November 1544)
 Niece: Princess Uihye (1521 – 1564) (의혜공주)
 Nephew-in-law: Han Gyeong-rok (한경록, 韓景祿)
 Grandnephew: Han Ui (한의, 韓漪)
 Grandnephew: Han Wan (한완, 韓浣)
 Grandnephew: Han Sun (한순, 韓淳)
 Grandniece: Lady Han
 Niece: Princess Hyosun (1522 – 1538) (효순공주)
 Nephew-in-law: Gu Sa-yeon (구사안, 具思顔) of the Neungseung Gu clan (1523 - 22 April 1562)
 Unnamed grandnephew (1538 - 1538)
 Adoptive grandnephew: Gu Hong (구홍, 具弘)
 Niece: Princess Gyeonghyeon (1530 – 1584) (경현공주)
 Nephew-in-law: Shin Ui (신의, 申檥)
 Grandnephew: Shin Sa-jeong (신사정, 申士楨)
 Nephew: King Myeongjong of Joseon (이환 경원대군) (3 July 1534 – 3 August 1567)
 Niece-in-law: Queen Insun of the Cheongseong Sim clan (인순왕후 심씨, 仁順王后 沈氏) (27 June 1532 - 12 February 1575)
 Grandnephew: Yi Bu, Crown Prince Sunhoe (순회세자 이부, 順懷世子 李暊) (1 July 1551 - 6 October 1563)
 Niece: Princess Insun (1542 – 1545) (인순공주)
 Wives and their issue(s)
 Lady Kim of the Yeonan Kim clan (연안 김씨)
 Son: Yun Seol (윤설, 尹紲)
 Son: Yun Hyo-won (윤효원, 尹孝源)
 Son: Yun Chong-won (윤충원, 尹忠源)
 Grandson: Yun Myeon (윤면)
 Son: Yun Dam-yeon (윤담연, 尹覃淵)
 Daughter-in-law: Lady Lee
 Daughter-in-law: Lady Kim
 Jeong Nan-jeong (정난정, 鄭允謙) of the Chogye Jeong clan (초계 정씨, 草溪 鄭氏) (? – 13 November 1565)
 Daughter: Lady Yun of the Papyeong Yun clan (파평 윤씨)

Popular culture
 Portrayed by Kim Jun-kyung in the 2013 KBS2 TV series The Fugitive of Joseon.
 Portrayed by Jung Joon-ho in the 2016 MBC TV series The Flower in Prison.
 Portrayed by Han Jae-suk in the 2019 TV Chosun TV series Joseon Survival Period.

See also 
 Eulsa massacre
 Jeong Nan-jeong
 Yi Gi
 Yun Im - Yun's third cousin
Queen Jeonghui - Yun's ascendant through his father
Queen Janggyeong - Yun's third cousin
Kim Ahn-ro

Notes

References

Sources

External links 
 Yun Won-hyeong 
 Yun Won-hyeong:Korean historical person information 
 Yun Won-hyeong:Navercast 
 을사사화 
 윤원형, 한국의 설화 
 윤원형의 몰락을 예언한 고래의 정체 사이언스 타임즈 

1509 births
1565 deaths
Korean politicians
16th-century Korean people
Papyeong Yun clan